Mannophryne larandina is a species of frog in the family Aromobatidae.
It is endemic to Venezuela.
Its natural habitats are subtropical or tropical moist montane forest and rivers.
It is threatened by habitat loss.

References

larandina
Amphibians of Venezuela
Endemic fauna of Venezuela
Taxonomy articles created by Polbot
Amphibians described in 1991